"Spotlight" is the second official single by rapper, Gucci Mane from his studio album The State vs. Radric Davis (2009). The song features a guest appearance by American singer Usher. The single was released on October 19, 2009 and was produced by Polow da Don.

Music video
The music video premiered on November 5, 2009. It shows Usher urging an upset Gucci Mane to come to his party. The video is directed by Benny Boom and has cameos from Eddie Murphy's oldest daughter Bria Murphy and Nicki Minaj of Young Money. It ranked at #56 on BET's Notarized: Top 100 Videos of 2009 countdown.

Charts
On the week ending November 14, 2009, "Spotlight" debuted at number 93 on the Billboard Hot 100. It then fell to number 97 but rebounded the following week to number 86 and reached its final peak of number 42.

Weekly charts

Year-end charts

Certifications

References

External links
http://showhype.com/music/gucci_mane/
http://www.mediafire.com/?nwygzyny2di

2009 singles
2009 songs
Gucci Mane songs
Usher (musician) songs
Warner Records singles
Asylum Records singles
Music videos directed by Benny Boom
Song recordings produced by Polow da Don
Songs written by Gucci Mane
Songs written by Usher (musician)